Monica Niculescu was the defending champion but chose not to participate.

Dalma Gálfi won the title, defeating Jodie Burrage in the final, 7–5, 4–6, 6–3.

Seeds

Draw

Finals

Top half

Bottom half

References

External Links
Main Draw

Ilkley Trophy - Singles